Venden "Vince" Leach is an American politician from Arizona. A Republican, he was a member of the Arizona State Senate from 2019 to 2023, representing District 11. From 2015 to 2019, he was a member of the Arizona House of Representatives representing District 11.

Career before politics
Originally from Coloma, Wisconsin, Leach received a bachelor's degree in political science/history from the University of Wisconsin, Stevens Point. Leach was a mineral-products salesman in Wisconsin until 2009, when he retired to Arizona. He then became a conservative activist and political candidate.

Political career
In the November 2014 election for District 11 in the Arizona House of Representatives (Pima and Pinal counties), Leach successfully ran alongside fellow Republican Mark Finchem. Finchem received 36,732 votes and Leach received 34,274 votes, defeating Democratic challenger Holly Lyon, who received 27,392 votes in the general election with 34,274 votes. In 2016, Leach and Finchem defeated Democratic candidate Corin Hammond in the general election: Finchem received 52,509 votes, Leach 49,209 votes, and Hammond 42,511 votes. In 2018, he was elected to the state Senate from Legislative District 11, a heavily Republican district, and he was reelected in 2020.

In 2019, Leach voted for a bill expanding so-called "junk" health insurance plans in Arizona that do not protect against pre-existing conditions.

Leach criticized Arizona public schoolteachers over the 2018 Arizona teachers' strike and for wearing red shirts to support salary increases. Leach called the "Red for Ed" movement a "political action" and, in 2019, supported a Republican bill to impose fines of up to $5,000 on educators deemed to have attempted to "indoctrinate" students by influencing their political or religious views.

In 2019, Leach sponsored legislation that would give unrestricted power to the Arizona attorney general to rewrite the ballot text of citizen voter initiatives. The bill failed after at least four Republicans joined all Democrats in opposing it. In 2020, Leach sponsored legislation to weaken the 1998 Voter Protection Act, an voter-approved amendment to the Arizona Constitution that barred the legislature from changing initiatives approved by the voters, unless they "further the purpose" of the voter initiatives and obtained a three-quarters supermajority vote of the Legislature. Leach said that he sponsored the Republican-supported measure due to his opposition to the voter-approved initiatives that authorized medical marijuana and raised the state minimum wage to $12. The bill passed a state Senate committee on a party-line vote.

Leach sponsored several anti-medical marijuana bills in the state Senate; none advanced.

In 2020, Leach promoted the conspiracy theory QAnon, a radical pro-Trump fringe movement, on social media. In 2021, Leach supported legislation that made it easier to purge Arizona voters from the early voting list. The bill, signed into law by Republican Governor Doug Ducey, was one of many efforts by Republicans nationwide to restrict voting following Trump's loss in the 2020 United States presidential election.

In 2021, Leach sponsored legislation that would block any Arizona county or municipal government from banning so-called gay "conversion therapy."  At the time, 20 states and Pima County, Arizona had enacted such bans.

In 2022, Leach sponsored Arizona legislation to give the legislature the power to overturn election results. He was defeated for reelection in the Republican primary by Justine Wadsack.

References

External links
 Official campaign page

21st-century American politicians
Living people
People from Wild Rose, Wisconsin
Place of birth missing (living people)
Politicians from Phoenix, Arizona
Republican Party members of the Arizona House of Representatives
Republican Party Arizona state senators
University of Wisconsin–Stevens Point alumni
Year of birth missing (living people)